Euriphene is a butterfly genus in the subfamily Limenitidinae. The 70 or so member species are confined to the Afrotropical realm. They are found mainly in the Guinean Forests of West Africa and the Congolian forests.

Description
Euriphene species resemble Bebearia. The upperside ground colour of the males of some species is grey overlain with a metallic steely-blue sheen (E. barombina, E. coerulea and E. veronica). In other species the ground colour is reddish brown (E. lysandra and E. gambiae). All the species have distinctive dark bars in the forewing cell and suffused dark markings on the rest of the wings. Many have an apical arc of small white spots. The head is wide with long, erect palpi. The antennae are very long, with a gradually-formed, robust club. The thorax is robust and woolly. The wing characters are forewings moderately large; costa very much arched; apex rather acute; hind-margin nearly straight. Hindwings sub-oval; hindmargin entire, or not strongly scalloped. The abdomen is rather small.

Taxonomy
The type species of the genus is Aterica tadema Hewitson.

Species
Listed alphabetically within species groups:
Subgenus Doricleana Hecq, 1994
Euriphene doriclea (Drury, 1782)
Euriphene lysandra (Stoll, [1790])
Euriphene melanops (Aurivillius, 1898)
Euriphene paralysandra d'Abrera, 2004
Subgenus Euriphenaria Hecq, 1994
The goniogramma species group
Euriphene batesana Bethune-Baker, 1926
Euriphene butleri (Aurivillius, 1904)
Euriphene camarensis (Ward, 1871)
Euriphene goniogramma (Karsch, 1894)
Euriphene ituriensis (Jackson & Howarth, 1957)
Euriphene luteostriata (Bethune-Baker, 1908)
Euriphene mundula (Grünberg, 1910)
Euriphene obtusangula (Aurivillius, 1912)
Euriphene pinkieana Bernardi, 1975
Euriphene ribensis (Ward, 1871)
Euriphene tessmanniana (Bryk, 1915)
The duseni species group
Euriphene adumbrata (Joicey & Talbot, 1928)
Euriphene canui Hecq, 1987
Euriphene duseni (Aurivillius, 1893)
Euriphene minkoi Bernardi, 1993
The atossa species group
Euriphene ampedusa (Hewitson, 1866)
Euriphene atossa (Hewitson, 1865)
Euriphene leonis (Aurivillius, 1899)
The gambiae species group
Euriphene gambiae Feisthamel, 1850
The barombina species group
Euriphene abasa (Hewitson, 1866)
Euriphene alberici (Dufrane, 1945)
Euriphene amaranta (Karsch, 1894)
Euriphene amicia (Hewitson, 1871)
Euriphene amieti  Collins & Larsen, 1997
Euriphene anaxibia  Hecq, 1997
Euriphene aridatha (Hewitson, 1866)
Euriphene atropurpurea (Aurivillius, 1894)
Euriphene atrovirens (Mabille, 1878)
Euriphene barombina (Aurivillius, 1894)
Euriphene bernaudi  Hecq, 1994
Euriphene coerulea  Boisduval, 1847
Euriphene conjungens (Aurivillius, 1909)
Euriphene core  Hecq, 1994
Euriphene ernestibaumanni (Karsch, 1895)
Euriphene excelsior (Rebel, 1911)
Euriphene fouassini  Hecq, 1994
Euriphene glaucopis  Gaede, 1915
Euriphene grosesmithi (Staudinger, 1891)
Euriphene hecqui  Collins & Larsen, 1997
Euriphene incerta (Aurivillius, 1912)
Euriphene intermixta (Aurivillius, 1904)
Euriphene iris (Aurivillius, 1903)
Euriphene jacksoni (Talbot, 1937)
Euriphene jolyana  Hecq, 1987
Euriphene kahli (Holland, 1920)
Euriphene karschi (Aurivillius, 1894)
Euriphene larseni  Hecq, 1994
Euriphene lomaensis  Belcastro, 1986
Euriphene mawamba (Bethune-Baker, 1908)
Euriphene milnei (Hewitson, 1865)
Euriphene moloukou  Hecq, 2002
Euriphene monforti  Hecq, 1994
Euriphene niepelti  Neustetter, 1916
Euriphene obani  Wojtusiak & Knoop, 1994
Euriphene obsoleta (Grünberg, 1908)
Euriphene pallidior (Hulstaert, 1924)
Euriphene pavo (Howarth, 1959)
Euriphene plagiata (Aurivillius, 1898)
Euriphene rectangula (Schultze, 1920)
Euriphene regula  Hecq, 1994
Euriphene saphirina  Karsch, 1894
Euriphene schultzei (Aurivillius, 1909)
Euriphene simplex (Staudinger, 1891)
Euriphene splendida  Collins & Larsen, 1997
Euriphene tadema (Hewitson, 1866)
Euriphene veronica (Stoll, 1780)
Unknown species group
Euriphene aurivillii  (Bartel, 1905)
Euriphene epe Pyrcz & Larsen, 2009
Euriphene kiki  Bernardi & Larsen, 1980
Euriphene romi (Aurivillius, 1898)
Euriphene rotundata  (Holland, 1920)
Euriphene taigola Sáfián & Warren-Gash, 2009

References

Jacques Hecq, 2002 Schmetterlinge der Erde, Butterflies of the World Part 15 Euriphene Edited by Erich Bauer and Thomas Frankenbach Keltern. Goecke & Evers ; Canterbury : Hillside Books. 
Seitz, A. Die Gross-Schmetterlinge der Erde 13: Die Afrikanischen Tagfalter. Plate XIII 37 et seq. as Diestogyna

External links

Euriphene types Royal Museum for Central Africa images
Images representing Euriphene at Consortium for the Barcode of Life

 
Limenitidinae
Nymphalidae genera
Taxa named by Jean Baptiste Boisduval